Mahmoud Fayad (March 9, 1925 – December 17, 2002) was a Featherweight (-60 kg) in the weightlifting Egyptian team at the Summer Olympics of 1948 in London. He scored a Gold medal for Egypt after lifting a record of 332.5 kg.

References

External links

See also 
 List of Egyptians

1925 births
2002 deaths
Sportspeople from Alexandria
Egyptian male weightlifters
Olympic weightlifters of Egypt
Weightlifters at the 1948 Summer Olympics
Olympic gold medalists for Egypt
Olympic medalists in weightlifting
Medalists at the 1948 Summer Olympics
20th-century Egyptian people
21st-century Egyptian people